Anphisbena is the fifth album by Opera IX.

Track listing

References

Opera IX albums
Avantgarde Music albums
2004 albums